Krasnoyarsk Railway Bridge in Krasnoyarsk, Siberia, carries the Krasnoyarsk Railway (part of the Trans-Siberian Railway) across the Yenisei River. It was originally a single-track truss bridge. The total length of the structure was 1 km, span width of 140 meters, the height of metal trusses in the vertex of the parabola was 20 meters.

History 

The bridge was built by Russian workers and technicians under the supervision of professional engineer Evgeny Karlovich Knorre to a design by Professor of the Imperial Moscow Technical School Lavr Proskuryakov. Construction started in 1895. The laying of the first stone took place on August 30, 1896. Participants in the ceremony included the Yenisei governor, P.M. Preynne, E.K. Knorre, as well as railway authorities and the casual urban dwellers.

The ceremony was essentially a prayer service held by Akaki (bishop of Yenisei and Krasnoyarsk). A stone with a cross was placed in the foundation of an abutment pier, and a manuscript was put therein that included information on the time and names of the builders and the guests of honor. During the prayer service, gold and silver coins were dumped onto the stone, and the first stone was covered by another one with the cement slurry.

The Yenisei bridge had the following characteristics: the entire length of 907 meters and the longest trusses (144.5 meters) among the other bridges that had been built by that time in Russia, a lightweight truss design, freezing method for stabilising soils, the use of wood for the construction of caissons, the compressed air bed in the working chamber, 
and the most expensive construction project — 3 million rubles.

The construction was completed on March 28, 1899. Load tests on the bridge took place on 27 March. Initially, two trains consisted of four engines and six carriages loaded with rails went across the bridge. Thereafter, two engines with carriages loaded with rails crossed the bridge at a speed of 70 km/h.

The structure received the Gold Medal at the Exposition Universelle (1900) by the special committee led by Gustave Eiffel.

Renovation 
In the 1930s, a second track was laid on the bridge in order to increase the capacity of the Trans-Siberian Railway. There was also another structurally similar bridge built nearby. 

In the 1990s, a decision was made to build support structures on the foundations of the former cutwaters of the old bridge, construct new spans on top, then demolish the old pre-revolutionary trusses while simultaneously sliding the new spans into place and onto its new supports. On December 25, 1998, the new bridge was opened to traffic, and in January 1999, the old bridge was closed to traffic. In the period from 2002 to 2007, the old trusses were completely dismantled. It is noteworthy that its demolishing took much longer than its construction.

References and notes

Krasnoyarsk
Railway bridges in Russia
Truss bridges
Bridges completed in 1896
Buildings and structures in Krasnoyarsk Krai
Yenisei River
Transport in Krasnoyarsk Krai
Cultural heritage monuments in Krasnoyarsk Krai
Objects of cultural heritage of Russia of regional significance